The 2013 FIA World Rally Championship-2 was the first season of the World Rally Championship-2, an auto racing championship recognised by the Fédération Internationale de l'Automobile, running in support of the World Rally Championship. It was created when the Group R class of rally car was introduced in 2013.

Unlike its predecessor, the Super 2000 World Rally Championship, the World Rally Championship-2 does not have a fixed calendar. Instead, teams and drivers competing in the series are free to contest any of thirteen rallies that form the 2013 World Rally Championship. They must nominate up to seven events to score points in, and their best six results from these seven events will count towards their final championship points score. The World Rally Championship is open to cars complying with R4, R5, Super 2000 and Group N regulations.

At the penultimate round of the season in Spain, Robert Kubica won the championship title by 25 points from Seashore Qatar Rally Team's Abdulaziz Al-Kuwari. Yuriy Protasov finished third in the championship. In the teams' championship, Seashore Qatar Rally Team won the championship with a lead of 47 points over Yazeed Racing. Peruvian Nicolás Fuchs has amassed enough points to win the Production Car Cup, having finished as best privateer at six of the seven events he has completed.

Teams and drivers
The following teams and drivers have competed in the 2013 World Rally Championship-2 season:

Driver changes
 Rashid al Ketbi will move from the Intercontinental Rally Challenge to the WRC-2 championship, competing with a Škoda Fabia S2000.
 Elfyn Evans will join the WRC-2 championship as part of his prize for winning the 2012 WRC Academy championship, driving a Ford Fiesta RRC prepared by M-Sport at selected events in 2013.
 Esapekka Lappi, who contested selected events of the Super 2000 World Rally Championship in 2011 and 2012 will contest the WRC-2 championship with Škoda Motorsport, driving a Škoda Fabia S2000.
 Valeriy Gorban and Oleksiy Kikireshko will switch from competing with the Mitsubishi Lancer Evolution IX to racing a Super 2000 version of the Mini John Cooper Works WRC under the Mentos Ascania Racing banner.
 Former Formula One driver Robert Kubica will contest seven rounds of the championship, driving a Citroën DS3 RRC alongside a European Rally Championship campaign.
 Sepp Wiegand will move into the WRC-2 full-time, after competing in the 2011 and 2012 Rallye Deutschland with a Škoda Fabia S2000 prepared by Volkswagen Motorsport.
 Former WRC driver Matthew Wilson will return to competition in the WRC-2 after spending most of the 2012 season recovering from an injury.

Rally summaries

Championship standings

Drivers' championship
Points are awarded to the top 10 classified finishers.

Co-Drivers' Championship

Teams' championship

Production Cup for Drivers

Production Cup for Co-Drivers

References

External links
Official website of the World Rally Championship

World Rally Championship-2